is a martial arts system taught by the Keijutsukai Kokusai Renmei (Keijutsukai International Federation), an independent aikido federation based in Tokyo, Japan.  It was founded by Thomas H. Makiyama in February 1980.  In 1999, Keijutsukai Aikido was approved by Temple University Japan for inclusion under the curriculum of the Continuing Education Program.

Style
Keijutsukai Aikido and  Keijutsu (a specialized method of defensive tactics for law enforcement personnel), emphasize rational and practical approaches, incorporating the Principle of Compatibility; Circular (marui) and Proper Operational Distance (maai). Movements and techniques are taught to flow naturally without force. 

Maai (Proper Distance) and Marui (Circle) concepts are shared with other Aikido styles. To develop coordination and balance; to control movements with the hips, while maintaining a stabilized center of gravity at the lower half of the body are also important and fundamental concepts. 

The techniques consist in throws, locks, and the application of nerve pressure points  designed to constantly keep an opponent off-balance and under control.

Statement of purpose
The Keijutsukai states to be "A Totally Independent AIKIDO Fraternity Devoted To International Friendship And Understanding Through The Medium Of Budō".

References

Sources
 Frank Paetzold, Wu Shu, Books on Demand GmbH (2003), p 151, 
 Thomas H Makiyama, The techniques of aikido, Jenkins (1963), ASIN: B0000CLSPM
 Thomas H Makiyama, Keijutsukai Aikido: Japanese Art of Self-defense, Ohara Publications Inc.,U.S. (1998), 

Aikido organizations